ARA Almirante Bartolomé Cordero (P-54) is the fourth and final Gowind-class offshore patrol vessel constructed for the Argentinian Navy.

The French shipbuilder Naval Group launched ARA Almirante Bartolomé Cordero on 21 September 2021 at Lanester. The ship was delivered to the Argentine Navy in April 2022. The ship sailed from France to Argentina in May/June 2022 and she was commissioned at the Mar del Plata Naval Base in July.

In November 2022, the ship carried out a relief and resupply mission to maritime traffic surveillance and control posts located on the islands of Tierra del Fuego and Isla de los Estados.

References

2021 ships